Robert John Clapp, known as Bob Clapp (born 12 December 1948 in Weston-Super-Mare, Somerset, England) is a former English cricketer.

He played first-class cricket for Somerset County Cricket Club between 1972 and 1977 but was more prolific in one-day cricket.  A right-arm medium pace bowler, Clapp holds the record for the most List A wickets in one season for Somerset, with the 51 that he claimed in 1974. In the same year he also broke the record for the most wickets taken in a season in the John Player league (34) 

However, Clapp only played 15 first-class matches for Somerset. His 25 first-class wickets were taken at an average of 29.36. Despite his successful 1974 season, Clapp enjoyed only mediocre success in his other seasons of one-day cricket. He claimed 25 wickets in his three other seasons.  In 1977 the bulk of Clapp's cricket was for Somerset's Second XI, and he retired from county cricket at the end of the 1979 season.

References

External links
 
 

1948 births
Living people
People from Weston-super-Mare
English cricketers
Somerset cricketers